The Vertical Integration Building was a building at Cape Canaveral Space Force Station in Florida, located at the far south end of the industrial area supporting SLC-40 and SLC-41. The building was one of the facilities of the Integrate-Transfer-Launch complex that was used to support Titan III and Titan IV launches.  These expendable launch systems were operated by the United States Air Force, both at CCAFS and at Vandenberg Air Force Base in California from 1965 to 2005. Several Titan rockets could be vertically integrated at the same time inside the Vertical Integration Building.  In that respect it was a precursor to the Vehicle Assembly Building used for the Saturn V and Space Shuttle. 

The Vertical Integration Building was dismantled in 2006.

See also
Horizontal Integration Facility

Sources 
 Controlled Explosion Demolishes Historic Titan Rocket Launch Tower
 

Cape Canaveral Space Force Station